Joan Maragall i Gorina (10 October 1860 in Barcelona – 20 December 1911) was a Spanish poet, journalist and translator, the foremost member of the modernisme movement in literature. His manuscripts are preserved in the Joan Maragall Archive of Barcelona.

Life
Maragall's upper-class family was dedicated to the flourishing textile industry in Barcelona, and after finishing school, Joan Maragall took on his father's job. Having never liked his family's trade, he decided to go to university instead, where he studied law to his father's great disappointment.

However, he dropped out of school and married Clara Noble with whom he had 13 children. In 1904 he won all three prizes awarded by the Jocs Florals in Barcelona, and was proclaimed Mestre en Gai Saber. His private home in Sant Gervasi was bought by the Biblioteca de Catalunya and can be visited. He died in 1911 and was buried at the Sant Gervasi Cemetery Barcelona.

His grandson, Pasqual Maragall, would become mayor of Barcelona and then President of Catalonia.

Work
Maragall's poetry was based on themes drawn from human life and nature. Highly influenced by German-language authors such as Nietzsche, Novalis and Goethe, all of which he translated into Catalan, his poetry went through periods of decadentism and vitalism. He is best known for his 'theory of the living word', or teoria de la paraula viva, which advocated Nietzschean vitalism and spontaneous or even imperfect writing over colder and over-thought poetry.

In addition to his poetry writing, Maragall published journalism in avant-garde magazines of the time—including L'Avenç, Catalònia and Luz—where he became the leading proponent of Catalan modernisme.

Maragall supported Iberian Federalism.

Poetic works
Poesies (1895)
Visions i Cants (1900)
Les Disperses (1904)
Enllà (1906), Fastenrath Award 1910.
Seqüències (1911)
includes the poem La fageda d'en Jordà

Digitized works
Digitization is available through the portal El món de Joan Maragall: Col·lecció visual de la vida i l'obra de l'autor or directly at Memòria Digital de Catalunya

See also

Modernisme
Catalan literature
Joan Maragall Archive

References

External links 
 Maragall Archive at National Library of Catalonia
 Digitized works of Joan Maragall at National Library of Catalonia
 Year Joan Maragall 2010-2011
 
 Biography and works of Maragall (Spanish)
 Vídeo Joan Maragall (Catalan)
 Joan Maragall vist per Jordi Maragall i Noble (Spanish)
 
 

1860 births
1911 deaths
Poets from Catalonia
Writers from Barcelona
Modernisme architects
Renaixença writers
Modernisme writers
German–Catalan translators
19th-century translators
Members of the Institute for Catalan Studies